Henry Township is located in Marshall County, Illinois. As of the 2010 census, its population was 2,700 and it contained 1,227 housing units.

History
Henry Township is named for Gen. James D. Henry.

Geography

Demographics

References

External links
City-data.com
Illinois State Archives

Townships in Marshall County, Illinois
Peoria metropolitan area, Illinois
Townships in Illinois
1849 establishments in Illinois